Édouard Roger-Vasselin was the defending champion, but chose not to compete.
Josselin Ouanna won the title, defeating Flavio Cipolla 6–4, 7–5 in the final.

Seeds

Draw

Finals

Top half

Bottom half

References
 Main Draw
 Qualifying Draw

Trophee des Alpilles - Singles
2012 Singles